This partial list of city nicknames in Missouri compiles the aliases, sobriquets and slogans that cities in Missouri are known by (or have been known by historically), officially and unofficially, to municipal governments, local people, outsiders or their tourism boards or chambers of commerce. City nicknames can help in establishing a civic identity, helping outsiders recognize a community or attracting people to a community because of its nickname; promote civic pride; and build community unity. Nicknames and slogans that successfully create a new community "ideology or myth" are also believed to have economic value. Their economic value is difficult to measure, but there are anecdotal reports of cities that have achieved substantial economic benefits by "branding" themselves by adopting new slogans.

Some unofficial nicknames are positive, while others are derisive. The unofficial nicknames listed here have been in use for a long time or have gained wide currency.
Branson 
Las Vegas If Ned Flanders Ran It
Brunswick – Home of the World's Largest Pecan
Carthage – The Maple Leaf City
Chillicothe – Home of Sliced Bread
Columbia
The Havana on the Hinkson
The Athens of Missouri 
CoMo
Cuba – Mural City
Hannibal 
America's Hometown
The Bluff City
Independence – Where the Trails Start and the Buck Stops
Jefferson City – City of Thomas Jefferson
Kansas City
BBQ Capital of the World
City of Fountains
Cowtown
Jazz Capital of the World
K.C. (inspiring the nickname of Casey Stengel, among others)
KCMO
Paris of the Plains
King City – The Gem of the Highway
Kirkwood – The Green Tree City
Lathrop – Mule Capital of the World
Marionville – Home of the White Squirrels
Moberly – Magic City
Neosho – Flower Box City
Nixa – Home of Jason Bourne
Peculiar – Where the Odds Are with You
St. Louis
Chess Capital of the World 
Gateway to the West
Lion of the Valley
The Lou
Mound City
River City
Rome of the West
There's More Than Meets the Arch
Salem – Charcoal Capital of the World
Sedalia – The Queen City of the Prairie
Springfield
Birthplace of Route 66
Queen City of the Ozarks
Sumner – Wild Goose Capital of the World
Warrensburg – The Burg
Washington – Corn Cob Pipe Capital of the World

See also
 List of city nicknames in the United States

References

Missouri cities and towns
Populated places in Missouri
City nicknames